Habib Haroon Haroon Saeed (born 5 October 2000) is a Bahraini footballer who plays as a midfielder for Malaysian club Terengganu.

Club career

Terengganu
On 14 June 2021, Habib signed a contract with Malaysian club Terengganu.

Career statistics

Club

Honours

Al-Riffa
 Bahraini Super Cup: 2019

Terengganu
 Malaysia Super League runner-up: 2022

References

External links
 

2000 births
Living people
Bahraini footballers
Bahraini expatriate footballers
Expatriate footballers in Malaysia
Association football midfielders
Riffa SC players
Terengganu FC players